Praveen Khandelwal (born 1960) is a Delhi-based businessman who is the founder and general secretary of an organisation called the Confederation of All India Traders (CAIT).

Education 
Khandelwal did his law graduation (LLB) from University of Delhi.

Career 
In 2017, Khandelwal was nominated to be a part of the government’s GST panel.

In 5 July 2021, Khandelwal was confirmed to be a member of Open Network for Digital Commerce (ONDC) as a Central Government panel's advisor.

Khandelwal launched a phase 2 campaign titled "Indian Goods - Our Pride" boycotting of Chinese goods across the country, aiming to achieve a reduction in imports of Chinese manufactured goods by 1 lakh crore (13 billion USD) by December 2021. On 15 August 2021, Independence Day of India, Khandelwal launched a new e-commerce portal Bharat-e-market to compete with incumbents Amazon India and Walnut-backed Flipkart.

References

Indian businesspeople
1960 births
Living people